Capital Group is a Russian development company founded in 1991, by Vladislav Doronin. Its area of activity is the integrated development of real estate projects. Capital Group took the first place in the Forbes rating of elite housing developers in Russia.

History 
Vladislav Doronin founded Capital Group in 1991, which was joined in 1993 by Eduard Berman and Pavel Tio.

In 2016, Pavel Tio was elected Chairman of the Board of Directors at Capital Group.

Owners 

The parent company controlling Capital Group is Capital Investments Limited (C.I.T.), a Cyprus company. The beneficial owners of Capital Investments Limited (C.I.T.) on a parity basis (33.3% each) are Vladislav Doronin, Pavel Tio and Eduard Berman.

Until 2016 Vladislav Doronin was the Chairman of the Board of the firm in addition to being responsible for investment sales and acquisitions, corporate finance, development of architectural concepts and marketing of projects. From 2016 Pavel Tio became Chairman, while continuing to be responsible for new projects, legal work and relationships with the Government of Moscow. Eduard Berman is in charge of construction management. The three partners take strategic decisions together and manage the company jointly.

On April 14 2022 Vladislav Doronin transferred the ownership of his stake in Capital Group Development LLC to his 87-year old mother Zinaida Doronina. According to Doronin’s lawyers, this was done for two reasons: to remove his exposure to possible sanctions from the Russian government in response to his anti-war stance and to “...distance himself from distance himself from Moscow at a time when the United States and Western nations were freezing assets and seizing properties of people connected to the Kremlin”.

Activities 

The portfolio includes 7.8 million square meters of completed, under construction and projected projects, of which 3.3 million square meters — in the active construction phase.

Capital Group specializes in mixed-use complexes, residential and commercial property construction. Besides traditional premium and business segments, since 2009 it has been developing large-scale (over a million square meters) residential projects of comfort class.

Performance 

 The company's revenue in 2015 was 35 billion rubles
 The company's revenue in 2019 was 72 billion rubles

Awards and ratings 

According to the results of Forbes magazine annual rating in 2009, Capital Group was included in TOP-10 of the most influential players among the major commercial property owners.
    
Capital Group's construction projects were acclaimed in professional and architectural circles. In 2010 "City of Capitals" was acknowledged as "The Best Mixed-Use Development" at CRE Awards`09; "Legend of Tsvetnoy" mixed-use development of deluxe class was acknowledged as "The Best Luxury Residential Complex" at Urban Awards 2010.

At the exhibition "Architectural Moscow. Comprehensive Approach 2010." "Legend of Tsvetnoy", "City of Yachts" and "Tricolor" mixed-use complex were awarded among the brightest objects implemented in Moscow over the last 10 years.

The OKO residential skyscraper tower was recognized internationally as the best Russian development project of 2016 and received the prestigious FIABCI Prix d'Excellence international award.

Scandals 

In 2007, a conflict arose between Capital Group and architect Erik van Egeraat. Frustrated that his Capital City project was allowed to be redesigned by another architect without his consent, as well as the unauthorized use of his drawings and sketches to advertise the complex, Eric van Egeraat filed a lawsuit in Stockholm Arbitration. In March 2008, the Stockholm arbitration court ruled to recover $3.6 million from Capital Group for work on the Capital City complex, part of Moscow City. In October 2008, Eric Van Egeraat also won in court a dispute over a similar case concerning the Barvikha Hills housing estate project in Barvikha, outside Moscow (the amount of compensation was $1 million).

In November 2010 "Capital Group" filed a lawsuit against Erik van Egeraat for protection of business reputation in Moscow Arbitration Court. The reason for the lawsuit was an interview with the Interfax news agency in which Eric van Egeraat spoke unflatteringly about the technical quality of the construction of the City of Capitals complex in Moscow City.

On January 11, 2011 the Moscow Arbitration Court approved a settlement agreement between Capital Group and the architect. Under the terms of the agreement, Eric van Egeraat is required to publish an official statement on the Interfax website that he had no intention of questioning the quality of the construction of the "City of Capitals" complex in his interview with the agency on September 17, 2010.

On May 5, 2011, a house built in the early 20th century to a design by architect Fyodor Kolbe on Bolshaya Yakimanka Street in central Moscow was demolished by the construction company ADS-424, a subsidiary of Capital Group, despite a ban by the Moscow government and protests by the public movement Archnadzor.

On May 31, 2016, Capital Group LLC began preparations for the construction of a 23-story apartment building at Zhivopisnaya Street (Moscow) (cadastral plot number 77:08:0009021:1004). Residents of Khoroshyovo-Mnevniki and Shchukino neighborhoods, environmentalists, and municipal deputies drafted a petition demanding public hearings and to cancel the construction, which, in their opinion, violates federal and Moscow environmental laws. Public hearings are mandatory for draft amendments to land use and development rules, but in this case there were none. According to the petition, the construction is unsafe because the site borders Moscow's largest gas regulating station "Shchukino", there is a high-pressure gas pipeline culvert "Strogino-Shchukino" and the experimental site "Gas Plant" of SRC "Kurchatov Institute", where reactors are located.

References 

Real estate companies